Chavan, Iran is a village in East Azerbaijan Province, Iran.

Chavan in Iran may also refer to:
 Chavan-e Alamdar
 Chavan Bagh
 Chavan-e Olya
 Chavan-e Sofla